Like Drawing Blood is the second studio album by Belgian-Australian singer-songwriter Gotye. All the sounds on the album were collected and assembled or performed by Wally De Backer in bedrooms around Melbourne between 2003 and 2005, and the record was mixed and mastered by François Tétaz (Wolf Creek soundtrack, Machine Translations, Architecture in Helsinki). It was featured heavily by Triple J in May 2006. At the J Award of 2006, the album was nominated for Australian Album of the Year.

Two songs from Like Drawing Blood rated in the Triple J Hottest 100, 2006: "Hearts a Mess" at number 8, and "Learnalilgivinanlovin" at number 94. Like Drawing Blood also received the number one spot on the 2006 Triple J Album Poll for best album of the year, as voted by Triple J listeners.

The album was also released in Belgium, in 2008, with three alterations: it contains a new version of "Learnalilgivinanlovin" with higher-pitched vocals in the chorus; the track "Coming Back" removes a sample in the intro and bridge, and the song "A Distinctive Sound" is replaced by a new version of "The Only Thing I Know" (the original appeared on Gotye's debut album Boardface). Also, three singles were released in Belgium: "Learnalilgivinanlovin", "Hearts a Mess", and "Coming Back".

Like Drawing Blood has also received the number 11 spot on the 2011 Triple J Hottest 100 Australian Albums of All Time, as voted by the Triple J listeners.

In 2012 it was awarded a double silver certification from the Independent Music Companies Association, which indicated sales of at least 40,000 copies throughout Europe.

Track listing
Australian release (2006)

International release (2008)

Reception

The album was well-received by critics. Andrew Drever of The Age said of the album that "De Backer bravely tackles a mind-boggling array of musical styles with conviction and flair...That he never once missteps, pulling off every musical style he attempts with aplomb and skill, highlights the arrival of an important new talent." Pitchfork described the album as "full of dark pop, produced with an open clarity that separates the numerous sounds and consequently comes off as huge and sweeping...Like Drawing Blood is memorable and captivating." PopMatters gave the album a favourable review, stating that "Like Drawing Blood plays as a remarkably consistent, high quality electronic mix album, with thoughtful song/song transitions and a sustained, easily established mood." Allmusic editor Jon O'Brien called the album "an impressively eclectic cut-and-paste affair" and stated, "A little more control in the editing suite might have helped, then, but Like Drawing Blood is still an engaging and diverse affair".

Appearances in media
 "Hearts a Mess" was featured in the 6th episode of the Seven Network's TV Show Packed to the Rafters.
 "Hearts a Mess" from Like Drawing Blood was featured in the 23rd episode entitled "The Wrath of Con" of the second season of the CW TV show Gossip Girl.
 "Learnalilgivinanlovin'" appears in the end credits of the 2010 film Going the Distance.
 "Hearts a Mess" appeared in the soundtrack 2013 film The Great Gatsby.

Credits
 Wally De Backer – lead and backing vocals, writing, production, performance, artwork
 Jacob Uljans – vocal recording on "Thanks for Your Time"
 Lucas Taranto – bass guitar on "Coming Back"
 Francois Tetaz – mixing, mastering, additional production
 Tim Shiel – album layout

Chart performance

Certifications

References

2006 albums
Albums recorded in a home studio
Gotye albums
Creative Vibes albums